ShortCutz Amsterdam (ShortCutz AMS) is an annual film festival promoting short films in Amsterdam, Netherlands held the whole year through.

Festival 
ShortCutz Amsterdam is a film festival held the whole year through, promoting Dutch short films in The Netherlands. Every week has two short films competing. After the end of the calendar month the jury will select the winner of the month. The winner of the month is then nominated for a Mr. Zee Award and the winners will be presented at the end of January at the ShortCutz Amsterdam Annual Award Ceremony
 at EYE Film Institute Netherlands. Winners of the Mr. Zee award will receive funding for their next film project, special screenings in cinema's and a distribution deal.

A unique aspect of the festival is that jury members are encouraged to give their personal feedback on the selected films. Giving the filmmakers the opportunity to have professionals like Rutger Hauer, Jan Harlan or Eddy Terstall comment on their films. Because of the informal vibe of the festival jury members can often be spotted at the weekly screening sessions, lowering the bar for young creatives to come in contact with well-known film professionals.

Screening locations
The weekly screening sessions are held at the De Kring (The Circle), located in the heart of Amsterdam, on the corner of the Leidseplein. It is one of the main artists clubs of the city. 

The ShortCutz Amsterdam Annual Awards Ceremony is held every January at the EYE Film Institute Netherlands. The EYE is a modern building located on the north bank of Amsterdam's waterfront, just behind the Central Station.

Mobile App
In 2019 the ShortCutz festival mobile app was released on Android and iOS. Giving mobile users an easy way to read about the news, weekly sessions and screening schedules. The app also gives the users the opportunity to connect with film professionals, upcoming talent and the film audience.

Programmes
The Official Selection
In Competition – Short films competing for the Mr. Zee Award. They are projected in De Kring Amsterdam.
Special Guests – Every session is accompanied by an influential guest from the film industry and will hold an open Q&A. 
ShortCutz Amsterdam Award Ceremony – Awards presentation honoring the best talent in short-film achievements. 
Events
Best of ShortCutz – Special selection of the best of films.
Marathon of New Dutch Cinema – In one night, it showcases the vitality and diversity of short films.
Shortcutz National Audience Awards.

Juries 
The jury composed of an ambassador and various film directors, actors, culture, and art personalities, determine the prizes for the best short films in the competition. The juries hold the responsibility for choosing the monthly winner and which films will receive a Mr. Zee award.

Notable jury members: Waldemar Torenstra, George Sluizer, Laser 3.14, Tygo Gernandt, Hanna Verboom, Mijke de Jong, Roel Reiné, Eddy Terstall, Ariane Schluter, Rutger Hauer, Jan Harlan, Willeke van Ammelrooy, Pieter Kuijpers.

Awards

Career Achievement Award
The Career Achievement Award has been awarded since 2013. The winners are: 2018 - Frans Weisz, 2017 - Heddy Honigmann, 2016 - Pieter Kuijpers, 2015 - Rutger Hauer, 2014 - Jos Stelling and 2013 - George Sluizer.

Mr. Zee Award winners 
The Mr. Zee Award has various sponsors, including ShortsTV, Camalot Amsterdam, Filmmore and EYE Film Institute Netherlands. The Mr. Zee awards are made by ProtoSpace.

References

External links 
ShortCutz Amsterdam (official website)

ShortCutz Amsterdam on FilmFreeway.com
Download the ShortCutz Amsterdam Mobile App on Android & iOS

 
Annual events
Culture in Amsterdam
Experimental film festivals
Film festivals in the Netherlands
Recurring events established in 2013
Film festivals established in 2012
Short film festivals
Tourist attractions in Amsterdam